The California Beach Volleyball Association, commonly known by the acronym CBVA, was the first governing body for beach volleyball. Since its founding in 1962, CBVA has coordinated local beach volleyball tournaments for players of all skill levels. In 2017, CBVA hosted nearly 1,000 tournaments at 23 beaches in 11 skill or age divisions. There are approximately 8,000 members from California and beyond.

History 
CBVA tournament organizers met in 1962 to coordinate tournament schedules and establish the rules of the game. The goal of the CBVA was to unite the local beach volleyball communities and to coordinate local tournament schedules.

Hall of Fame 
The CBVA Beach Volleyball Hall of Fame is a collaboration between CBVA and the Hermosa Beach Historical Society. To be eligible for the Hall of Fame, individuals must either be a top ranked volleyball player who has maintained a high degree of excellence and superior play over a significant period of time and demonstrated significant CBVA participation or someone who has devoted a major part of their life to the sport of beach volleyball and made positive and meaningful contributions. For players, five years must have passed since playing at their highest competitive level (for players). The Hall of Fame Committee develop a list of player nominees and selects at least one male and one female; no more than three players can be inducted each year.

Board of Directors 
CBVA's board of directors is largely made up of former professional beach volleyball players:

 Chris Brown: president and tournament director at Hermosa Beach.
 JP Saikley: tournament director at Manhattan Beach Pier
 Sinjin Smith: tournament director Long Beach;
 Dane Selznick: tournament director at Santa Monica North
 Steve Upp: tournament director at Ocean Beach & Mission Beach in San Diego
 Therese Butler: tournament director at Huntington Beach
 Danny Rubio: tournament director at Ocean Park, Santa Monica

References

Beach volleyball in the United States
Sports governing bodies in the United States
Sports organizations established in 1962
Beach